Aylesbury High School (AHS) was founded in 1959, in Aylesbury, Buckinghamshire, when the previously co-educational Aylesbury Grammar School (founded 1598) split to become two single-sex grammar schools. The two institutions remain on adjacent sites. The school takes its pupils from a wide area as far from Aylesbury as Oxford and Milton Keynes, as admissions are determined by the eleven-plus. The current headmistress is Marieke Forster.

The school is colloquially referred to by locals as "Aylesbury Girls'" and by the students as "the High" or "AHS".

Admissions
The school is a selective state-funded grammar school, and as such entry requirements are dictated by the eleven-plus, now called transfer tests, although several students are admitted on appeal to Buckinghamshire County Council. In the fairly unusual event of free places, the school will accept pupils in Year 8 upon success in the twelve-plus, and later upon reasonable evidence that prospective pupils are academically capable. A large number of pupils are also admitted in the Sixth Form from both local state and independent schools, though impressive GCSE results are required and competition for these places is high.

The school educates girls from the age of 11, in Year 7, through to the age of 18, in Upper VI. The school has its largest intakes at Year 7 followed by Lower VI. On completing GCSEs, most girls stay on to complete their A-levels at the school's sixth-form.

It is situated east of the town centre on the southern side of the A41, between Walton (to the west) and Victoria Park (to the east). This site was built and opened in 1959 by Princess Alexandra, and is reflective of the modern, minimalist post-war architecture of the time. The school is housed in gardens which the students enjoy particularly in the summer.

Specialist status
The school has been awarded specialist school status in Languages, which it kept until Summer 2011, when it gained Academy Status. Languages remain a particular strength at the school and are extensively resourced and promoted. Each girl is required to take at least one language to GCSE level, and many take languages on to A Level and university.

Academy status
In July 2011 the school became an Academy.

Current senior teaching staff
There are currently six members of the school's Senior Leadership Team:
Headmistress- M Forster
Finance and Operations Director - L Greenway
Acting Deputy Headteachers – H Queralt (Pastoral & DSL) and C Wilkes (Academic)
Assistant Head' I Ochitree (Head of 6th Form), O Raven (Quality of Education), V Burt (Acting - Data), L Sowah (Acting - Trips and Visits), R Hughes (Acting - Personal Development) There are currently seven Heads of Year at the school, one for each Year GroupYear 7 – J QuesneYear 8 – S SaundersYear 9 – S SheppardYear 10 – E TaylorYear 11 – C StanleyYear 12  – I OchiltreeYear 13 ''' – M Sutton

Houses
Each pupil is placed into one of six houses upon starting at the school. The houses are as follows:

The house cup
Every year, each house battles to win the House Cup. During the last week of term is the concluding House Event, House Athletics. Then, on the last day of term, the winning house is announced. Now merit marks, that the pupils earn, count toward the house cup.

There are several house events, such as:

The school also holds numerous minor sporting inter-house events.

House Points awarded for exemplary work also contribute, though comparatively insignificantly, to the House Cup.

A points system is then used to determine the winner of the Cup. The result is usually hotly contested in the hours after the announcement.

Head girls
The school appoints seven members of Year 13 to the positions of Head Girl and six Deputy Head Girls in a group formally known as the School Cabinet. Girls are short-listed for these roles by the nominations of members of their year group, and are subsequently elected by students, staff and members of the senior leadership team based on maturity, behaviour, attitude, academic achievements and contribution to school and house events. They are identified by light blue lacquer Head Girl and dark blue lacquer Deputy Head Girl badges.

Teaching system
In the first three years at Aylesbury High School, girls are almost exclusively taught in their houses (with the exceptions of Maths, in which pupils are streamed by ability in year 8–9, and by their Foreign Language choice in year 8–9. Houses are also paired (Ascott with Claydon, Hughenden with Missenden and Stowe with Waddesdon) and then split up into groups of 15–20 for Design Technology lessons and Art lessons in Years 8–9.

In Year 10 and above, the year group is reshuffled into different classes for each subject depending on their GCSE options these different GCSE choices mean they may not see others from either tutor group or form. From this point onwards, the houses play a lesser role in the day-to-day life of students but continue to organise teams for the House Cup as well as taking house assemblies and sharing a form room with other house members in their year, where students generally congregate during break-time and lunch if they are not eating in the Dining Room.

In the Sixth Form, all form groups are reshuffled and divided into smaller groups. One member of staff is responsible for each of these forms and oversees their progression to university and UCAS applications. Interview advice is given by the Head of Sixth Form Mr Ochiltree and Deputy Head of Sixth Form Mrs Sutton.

The school is also known for offering a wide range of subjects at both GCSE and A Level.

Academic performance
Aylesbury High School consistently ranks in the top 100 schools in the country for exam results. Previous rankings (2012) listed Aylesbury High School as 15th nationally and A Level Results within the top 100 selective schools (including independent schools).

Scholarships
The school gives an annual travel scholarship award to honour the memory of Jane Brownlee a Head of Geography who died in service in 1998. The award is presented by her son Ben Brownlee and is awarded to a pupil in Year 13 to support travel in their gap year.

Charity
The school is locally known for taking fundraising to (frequently comical) extremes – including sky-dives and 20-hour treks. On Tuesday 21 November 2006 the school broke the world record for the number of Christmas crackers pulled simultaneously. In addition to setting a new Guinness World Record of 1,217 Christmas crackers, the school pupils also raised over £2,500 in sponsorship for children's charity the NSPCC.

The prime minister's global fellowship
The school has a good record of students attaining places on the prestigious Prime Minister's Global Fellowship programme. The school achieved its first student in the inaugural year of the programme, 2008, and in 2009 had 2 successful applicants.

Notable former pupils

 Lynda Bellingham, actress
 Emma Brockes, writer  
 Claire Foy, actress
 Joanna Gosling, news presenter (BBC News)
 Anne Mills FRS, health economist
 Dr Sarah Woodhouse, research psychologist and trauma expert, author, former Liberal Democrat councillor, and Remain campaigner during Brexit 2016 referendum.

References

External links
Department for Education Performance Tables 2011

Aylesbury
Grammar schools in Buckinghamshire
Training schools in England
Girls' schools in Buckinghamshire
Educational institutions established in 1959
Academies in Buckinghamshire
1959 establishments in England